Avildsen is a surname. Notable people with the surname include:

Ash Avildsen (born 1981), American film director, screenwriter, producer, and chief executive
John G. Avildsen (1935–2017), American film director